The Bonnie Brier Bush is a 1921 British drama film directed by Donald Crisp. Alfred Hitchcock is credited as a title designer. The film is considered to be lost.

Plot
As described in a film magazine, dour Scottish shepherd Lachlan Campbell (Crisp) is exceedingly harsh with his daughter Flora (Glynne). Flora and Lord Malcolm Hay (Fraser), the son of the Earl of Kinspindle (Robertshaw), marry secretly according to Scottish custom, and parental objection leads to misunderstandings followed by separation and misery. A logical resolution leads to a satisfactory ending.

Cast
 Donald Crisp as Lachlan Campbell
 Mary Glynne as Flora Campbell
 Alec Fraser as Lord Malcolm Hay
 Dorothy Fane as Kate Carnegie
 Jack East as Posty
 Langhorn Burton as John Carmichael (credited as Langhorne Burton)
 Jerrold Robertshaw as Earl of Kinspindle
 Adeline Hayden Coffin as Margaret Howe (credited as Mrs. Hayden-Coffin)

See also
 Alfred Hitchcock filmography

References

External links

1921 films
Lost British films
1921 drama films
British black-and-white films
Paramount Pictures films
Films directed by Donald Crisp
British silent feature films
British drama films
1921 lost films
Lost drama films
1920s British films
Silent drama films